"Jag skulle vilja tänka en underbar tanke" ("I would like to think a wonderful thought") is a pop song written by Swedish singer and composer Per Gessle. It is the second single released from his sixth studio album En händig man, in digital format only. A promotional single (CDPRO 4410) was also released. It spent seven weeks on the Swedish Singles Chart, peaking at number 29.

The song was tested for Svensktoppen, where it entered on August 19, 2007 at number seven. Totally, the song spent eight weeks on Svensktoppen, peaking at number six.

Formats and track listings

Digital download
(July 9, 2007)
"Jag skulle vilja tänka en underbar tanke" - 3:16

Swedish promotional CD
(CDPRO 4410; July 9, 2007)
"Jag skulle vilja tänka en underbar tanke" - 3:16

Charts

Personnel
Producers: Clarence Öfwerman, Christoffer Lundquist & Per Gessle.
Music & lyrics: Per Gessle.
Publisher: Jimmy Fun Music.
Photo: Anton Corbijn.

References

2007 singles
Per Gessle songs
Songs written by Per Gessle
2007 songs
EMI Records singles